Hrvoje Tkalčić (born 3 February 1970) is Australian and Croatian scientist (geophysicist) and Professor at the Australian National University in Canberra.

Biography 
Hrvoje Tkalčić studied physics and geophysics at the University of Zagreb (Faculty of Science), from which he obtained a Diploma of Engineering in Physics (speciality in Geophysics with meteorology) in 1996. He continued his postgraduate study at the University of California at Berkeley in the Department of Earth and Planetary Science, and defended a PhD thesis entitled "Study of deep Earth structure using seismic body waves" in 2001.
He was employed as a research assistant at the UC Berkeley Seismological Laboratory (1997-2001), as a postdoctoral fellow at the Institute of Geophysics and Planetary Physics of the University of California San Diego (2002-2003), and as a postdoctoral researcher at Lawrence Livermore National Laboratory in Livermore, California (2003-2006). In 2006, he began a continuing position as Scientist in the Seismology group at Multimax, Inc., in Emeryville, California. From 01/2007 until 04/2013, he was a Fellow at the Research School of Earth Sciences (RSES) of the Australian National University (ANU), Canberra, Australia. From 04/13 until 12/18, he was a Senior Fellow and Associate Professor in Seismology and Mathematical Geophysics at RSES, ANU. He has been Head of Seismology and Mathematical Geophysics since 01/17 and Professor since 01/19.

He has published 104 papers in peer-review journals in the field of seismology and mathematical geophysics and an academic book on the Earth's inner core. His primary research interests involve studying Earth's structure and dynamics using state-of-the-art seismological techniques, with the main focus on the Earth's core and the lowermost mantle, and developing new techniques for imaging Earth's interior, including both seismic and correlation wavefield. Other interests include studying the physics of tectonic and volcanic earthquakes by means of waveform modelling and improving volumetric raypath coverage of the Earth's interior through the installation of seismic instruments in remote parts of the planet, including on the ocean bottom.

He participated in a number of scientific field campaigns to establish temporary seismic networks in remote parts of Australia and the Southern Ocean. The main objective has been to image the structure of the Earth's crust and upper mantle using seismic tomography and other imaging techniques. He actively participates in special sessions at a number of international geophysical conferences. He is a member of the American Geophysical Union and Seismological Society of America, and a Fellow of the Japan Society for the Promotion of Science. He has been serving on the editorial board of the journals Physics of the Earth and Planetary Interiors and Scientific Reports. He is currently a member of the Australian Research Council College of Experts and New Zealand Ministry of Business, Innovation and Employment College of Assessors. He is Director of Warramunga Seismic and Infrasound Research Station in Northern Territory, Australia.

Academic Honours 
 2022 – Price Medal of the Royal Astronomical Society
 2020 – Elected Fellow of the American Geophysical Union
 2016 – Excellence in Research Achievement Award by AuScope
 2010/2011 –  Fellow of the Japan Society for the Promotion of Science (JSPS)
 2002 – Outstanding Student Paper Award by American Geophysical Union
 1997 – The Perry Byerly Graduate Fellowship in Seismology, UC Berkeley

Books 
 Tkalčić, H.: »The Earth's Inner Core Revealed by Observational Seismology«, Cambridge (UK): Cambridge University Press, 2017. 
 Tkalčić, H.: »Potresi: divovi koji se ponekad bude«, Zagreb: Naklada Ljevak, 2022.

References

External links 
Who is Who in Croatian Science: Hrvoje Tkalčić 
Google Scholar: Hrvoje Tkalčić (Publications) 
The Australian National University – Research School of Earth Sciences: Hrvoje Tkalčić (Publications)
The Australian National University – Research School of Earth Sciences: Hrvoje Tkalčić (Curriculum Vitae)
 Research Gate: Hrvoje Tkalčić (Publications)

1970 births
People from Vinkovci
People from Bjelovar
Fellows of the American Geophysical Union
Croatian physicists
Croatian geophysicists
Australian geophysicists
Faculty of Science, University of Zagreb alumni
University of California, Berkeley alumni
Living people